Ventsislav Vasilev (born 8 July 1988) is a Bulgarian professional footballer who currently plays as a defender for Minyor Pernik.

Career
He started his professional career in his former club Minyor Pernik in 2006. He left the club in 2010 for joining Aris Limassol. He returned to his former club Minyor Pernik in 2011. He was Minyor Pernik captain  in his last season 2012–2013.

On 21 December 2012, Vasilev signed a two-and-a-half-year deal with CSKA Sofia.

International career
On 7 February 2015, Vasilev made his first appearance for Bulgaria, in the 0–0 draw with Romania in a non-official friendly match, playing over the course of the entire game. He earned his first cap on 28 March 2015, after coming on as a late substitute in the 2–2 home draw with Italy in a Euro 2016 qualifier.

References

External links
 
 

1988 births
Living people
Bulgarian footballers
Bulgaria international footballers
Bulgaria under-21 international footballers
Bulgarian expatriate footballers
First Professional Football League (Bulgaria) players
Cypriot First Division players
Cypriot Second Division players
PFC Minyor Pernik players
Aris Limassol FC players
PFC CSKA Sofia players
PFC Beroe Stara Zagora players
SFC Etar Veliko Tarnovo players
FC Arda Kardzhali players
FC CSKA 1948 Sofia players
FC Tsarsko Selo Sofia players
Expatriate footballers in Cyprus
Association football defenders
People from Pernik